Cura del Popolo (Care of the People) is an Italian non-profit association operating in Vietnam, in the city of Da Nang. Founded in 2002 by Italian doctor, Enzo Falcone, and his wife, Luu Thi Minh Tam, Cura del Popolo focuses on assisting disadvantaged families, in particular women and children.

Organisation
Cura del Popolo is an Italian non-governmental organization operating in Viet Nam. Founded in 2002 as a health organization, it has become eclectic, organizing projects depending on local needs. Over the years they have advocated the construction of a hospital (dedicated to Carlo Urbani), a children's Centre (Casa del Sorriso), a mass for the poor, vocational courses, microloans at zero interest, construction of houses for the homeless and renovation of dilapidated housing. It is currently operational in health and welfare, with projects in particular for underprivileged children and women in extreme poverty in Vietnam. The association works to help create a model of sustainable development, through the redistribution of wealth and the promotion of social equality.

Enzo Falcone
Enzo Falcone graduated in Medicine and Surgery cum laude at the University of Milan. He worked for Médecins Sans Frontières, the United Nations and UNICEF. In 1994, while working in northern Vietnam, he met his wife, Tam, who in 2002 founded Cura del Popolo. In 2009 for his contributions to Vietnam, he received Vietnamese citizenship under the name of Luu Hoa Binh, which in Vietnamese means peace.

Philosophy
The mission of Cura del Popolo is the reduction of poverty and its causes first. All programs of Cura del Popolo are long-term, brought forth by clubs and individuals who know the local situation, and aim to achieve economic self-reliance for recipients. Cura del Popolo is a small and flexible organization, which rejects government funds to act without suffering any political influence. The organization is financed through private donations.

Current projects

"Fammi andare a scuola"
Support for the education of children and youth and their families, through grants and direct aid. Currently supports 140 children, supporting them throughout the duration of their course of studies, from primary school to university.

"Casa del Sorriso 2"
A home for children whose family situation does not permit inclusion in the project "Fammi andare a scuola". This project is designed to follow the children throughout the school growth path, supporting them even during their undergraduate studies. The "Casa del Sorriso" is a House like any other, and children living there are not provided just enough to survive, but everything a normal baby needs to be healthy and happy. All children are looked after by a local team that relies on the contributions of volunteers and experts.

"Aiutiamoli ad Aiutarsi" ("Let us help you to help yourself")
The project is directed to poor families who live in cities or in rural areas and is intended to offer an opportunity to work for families in difficulty, with the intent to make them able to support their own destiny, helping them to achieve self-employment through projects that generate income, allowing them to support themselves and their families.

References

External links
 Aspeninstitute.it
 Repubblica.it
 Lecourrier.vnanet.vn
 Thanhniennews.com

Charities based in Italy
21st-century establishments in Italy
Foreign charities operating in Vietnam